The Ramona false memory case concerns a California man, Gary Ramona, who successfully sued psychiatrists who he said had implanted false memories of abuse into his daughter. This was the first instance of a lawsuit against a therapist over implanted memories. It was also the first instance of a person who was not a patient bringing a malpractice suit in this field.

Background
Gary Ramona was a vice president for worldwide marketing of Robert Mondavi Winery and made an annual salary of $400,000, and was married to Stephanie Ramona. Daughter Holly Ramona, a student at the University of California, Irvine, had experienced bulimia and depression and sought treatment in the beginning of 1990. From 1989 to 1990 she was treated at Western Medical Center in Anaheim, California. Marche Isabella, a counselor for children, families, and marriages, told Holly and Stephanie that bulimia was usually caused by incest. Isabella stated that sexual abuse affected 60–70% of her patients experiencing eating disorders. Isabella had not received much training in the eating disorder realm although initial reports stated that this was her specialty. Western Medical chief of psychiatry Richard Rose also treated Holly Ramona. Holly, at this point believing her father raped her, agreed to take sodium amytal, administered by Rose, which was meant to recover memories.

Holly Ramona confronted her father at a March 15, 1990 meeting at Western Medical, in which her mother was also present. She accused Gary of raping her from the time when she was 5 until when she was 8, and that these memories were triggered when her father looked at her in a sexually-charged way during a Christmas 1989 visit to their house. Gary's wife Stephanie divorced him, and he lost his family and job.

Isabella moved to Virginia and continued her career there, while Rose moved to Hawaii and stopped practicing psychiatry. Holly Ramona entered a master's program in clinical psychology at Pepperdine University.

Lawsuit
In Napa County Superior Court, Gary Ramona, represented by lawyer Richard Harrington, sued Western Medical, Rose, and Isabella, stating that the parties gave his daughter false memories and that the alleged sexual abuse never occurred. He asked for $8,000,000 for wages he would have earned if he had not lost his job and general damages. Lenore Terr, an advocate of recovered memories, served as the chief witness of the defense.

Terr was cross-examined on whether Holly Ramona's flashbacks of abuse were accurate, and she stated that the one in which Holly gave a dog oral sex was not accurate. During the trial, Harrison Pope, a Harvard University physician and expert on bulimia, stated that bulimia was not influenced by one being sexually assaulted as a child.

In 1994 the jury voted 10–2 against the defendants, and awarded Ramona $500,000, with half corresponding to damages faced in the future and the other half for wages not being earned. Stephanie Ramona stated that she continued to believe the therapists and her daughter. Jury foreman Thomas Dudum stated that he disliked how Ramona perceived the verdict as a victory and that the jury intended "to make it clear that we did not believe, as Gary indicates, that these therapists gave Holly a wonder drug and implanted these memories."

B. Drummond Ayres Jr. of The New York Times stated that the decision bolstered critics against the repressed memory theory.

Legacy
Author Moira Johnston wrote the 1997 book Spectral Evidence: The Ramona Case: Incest, Memory, and Truth on Trial in Napa Valley.

See also
 Recovered-memory therapy
 False memory syndrome

References

External links
 Ramona v. Superior Court (Ramona) (1997)
 Court of Appeal, Second District, Division 1, California. Gary RAMONA, Petitioner, v. The SUPERIOR COURT of Los Angeles County, Respondent. Holly RAMONA, Real Party in Interest. No. B111565. Decided: August 19, 1997

Ramona, Gary
Year of birth missing (living people)